In ADO.NET, a DataAdapter functions as a bridge between a data source, and a disconnected data class, such as a DataSet. At the simplest level it will specify SQL commands that provide elementary CRUD functionality. At a more advanced level it offers all the functions required in order to create Strongly Typed DataSets, including DataRelations. Data adapters are an integral part of ADO.NET managed providers, which are the set of objects used to communicate between a data source and a dataset. (In addition to adapters, managed providers include connection objects, data reader objects, and command objects.) Adapters are used to exchange data between a data source and a dataset. In many applications, this means reading data from a database into a dataset, and then writing changed data from the dataset back to the database. However, a data adapter can move data between any source and a dataset. For example, there could be an adapter that moves data between a Microsoft Exchange server and a dataset.

Sometimes the data you work with is primarily read-only and you rarely need to make changes to the underlying data source Some situations also call for caching data in memory to minimize the number of database calls for data that does not change. The data adapter makes it easy for you to accomplish these things by helping to manage data in a disconnected mode. The data adapter fills a DataSet object when reading the data and writes in a single batch when persisting changes back to the database. A data adapter contains a reference to the connection object and opens and closes the connection automatically when reading from or writing to the database. Additionally, the data adapter contains command object references for SELECT, INSERT, UPDATE, and DELETE operations on the data. You will have a data adapter defined for each table in a DataSet and it will take care of all communication with the database for you. All you need to do is tell the data adapter when to load from or write to the database.

ADO.NET Data Access technologies
Microsoft application programming interfaces